Melvin is an unincorporated community in Choctaw County, Alabama, United States. Its ZIP code is 36913.

Notes

Unincorporated communities in Choctaw County, Alabama
Unincorporated communities in Alabama